The Meuse-Argonne American Memorial (Montfaucon American Monument) is an American World War I memorial commemorating "the brilliant victory of the American First Army in the Meuse-Argonne offensive, September 26 – November 11, 1918, and pays tribute to the previous heroic services of the Armies of France on the important battle front upon which the memorial has been constructed." It was erected by the United States Government and is the largest of the American war memorials in Europe. Outside Montfaucon in the Meuse department in Grand Est in north-eastern France, it was unveiled on August 1, 1937. The memorial was designed by John Russell Pope. He designed a massive, Doric column in granite.

Description 
The Meuse-Argonne American Memorial is made of a large Doric-style granite column, on top of which stands a statue symbolizing liberty. The memorial was built near the ruins of the ancient village, destroyed during World War I. On the walls of the foyer is an account of the offensive. It pays homage to the troops who served there. The observation platform of the memorial can be reached by ascending 234 stairs, and offers an excellent view of the battlefield.

Inauguration 
The memorial was unveiled on August 1, 1937, in the presence of the President of the French Republic, Albert Lebrun. Franklin D. Roosevelt, then the President of the United States, delivered a radio address for the ceremony from Washington, D.C.

Gallery

See also 
 Meuse-Argonne American Cemetery
 Meuse-Argonne Offensive
 World War I memorials

References

Further reading

External links 

 Official
 
 General information
 Montfaucon American Monument Dedication in 1937 at American Battle Monuments Commission

1937 establishments in France
1937 sculptures
Aftermath of World War I in France
American Battle Monuments Commission
Government buildings completed in 1937
Buildings and structures in Meuse (department)
First United States Army
History of Grand Est
John Russell Pope buildings
Protected areas of France
Tourist attractions in Meuse (department)
World War I memorials in France
20th-century architecture in France